Sarah Cleto Hassan Rial  (born 10 November 1967) is a South Sudanese politician and human rights activist serving as the current governor of Western Bahr el Ghazal. She was the only woman among the eight governors appointed by President Salva Kiir on June 30, 2020.

Early life and education 
Hassan was born on 10 November 1967 in the village of Abu Shaka, Bahr el Ghazal. She hails from the Golo people of Western Bahr el Ghazal.

She attended the College of Social and Economic Studies, at the University of Juba, previously in Khartoum Sudan and graduated with a B.S. in Statistics and Demography, in 1991 and an M.A. in Political Science/Professional Development from The American University in Cairo in 1996. 
She obtained a M.A. in the Program for Women in Politics and Public Policy, at the University of Massachusetts Boston in 2006 and a graduate with Certificate of Peace and Conflict Resolution from the Rotary Peace Centre, Chulalongkorn University, Bangkok, Thailand in 2014.

Personal life
Hassan has three sons.

References 

South Sudanese politicians
People from Bahr el Ghazal
Living people
1967 births